Madan Sahni is an Indian Politician from Bihar. He belongs to Janata Dal (United).

He has been elected thrice to the legislative assembly and he represents Bahadurpur (Vidhan Sabha constituency). He has also represented Gaura Bauram constituency (2015-2020).

Political life 
Madan Sahni's political career has seen a meteoric rise. Starting from Panchayat to Bihar legislative Assembly. He was elected to Zila Parishad and later won the District Board Chairman election. Soon, due to his social works and ground understanding of politics, he was given JD(U) symbol to contest from Bahadurpur constituency. He successfully contested that election. 
In the next election (2015), he was shifted to Gaura Bauram constituency which he won too by a bigger margin, thus being inducted as Cabinet Minister. 
In the 2020 election, he made a comeback to his home constituency of Bahadurpur and won. 
He is currently serving as Social Welfare Minister of Bihar.

2020 Bihar Legislative Assembly Election

References 

Janata Dal (United) politicians
Living people
Bihar MLAs 2020–2025
Year of birth missing (living people)